Central Tagbanwa is spoken on Palawan Island in the Philippines. It is not mutually intelligible with the other languages of the Tagbanwa people.

Phonology

Consonants 

  preceding a high front vowel  is usually realized as an affricate sound .

Vowels 

Grammar

Pronouns
The following set of pronouns are the personal pronouns found in the Central Tagbanwa language. Note: some forms are divided between full and short forms.

The demonstratives are as follows.

Notes

References

 

Palawanic languages
Languages of Palawan